Woodhaven Boulevard is a major boulevard in the New York City borough of Queens.

Woodhaven Boulevard may also refer to:
Woodhaven Boulevard (IND Queens Boulevard Line), serving the  trains
Woodhaven Boulevard (BMT Jamaica Line), serving the  trains

See also
 Woodhaven Boulevard buses